Brinjevec (or Brinovec) is a strong alcoholic drink, produced in the Karst and Brkini regions in Slovenia. It is re-distilled from ground and fermented juniper berries only and it differs from similar drinks that have different alcohol bases with added juniper flavor (compound Gin, Slovak Borovička, Dutch Jenever, Serbian Klekovača, etc.). It has a clear transparent color and it is meant for folk medicinal use and not for regular drinking. It contains between 40% and 50% alcohol and has a very distinctive tart taste

Kraški brinjevec means 'Karst gin' or 'Karst juniper brandy'.

History

The word brinovec derives from the word brin 'juniper' and it is made from juniper berries.

Kraški brinjevec has been made by local farmers in the Karst and Brkini regions for centuries. It was first mentioned 200 years ago. It has always been appreciated by locals for its curative effects as a cure for many problems. Because it is fermented only from juniper berries (from 100 to 150 kilos of berries for 10 liters of spirit) and distilled and re-distilled in a special copper still, it costs €30 or more per liter (2010) if buying from local farmers.

Kraški brinjevec is mentioned in several books such as National Geographic's Taste Slovenia by Janez Bogataj and Lonely Planet's Slovenia - History, Culture & Outdoors as an exquisite traditional drink. It has also found its way into the brochure of Slovene souvenirs published by "Slovenia's Official Travel Guide".

Brinjevec is sold in some bars and inns for drinking as well. However most cases such brinjevec is merely a cheap surrogate of traditional Karst brinjevec. Usually made from plum brandy, tropinovec (pomace brandy), or even alcohol made of fermented potatoes with added juniper flavor. Some prefer it this way as taste is milder and it is more drinkable.

Geographical indication of Kraški brinjevec

The Slovenian parliament passed the Act on Rules Concerning the Designation of Geographical Origin of Kraški brinjevec (Karst Gin) on 30 June 2003. On 15 January 2008 the European Parliament passed a regulation on the definition, description, presentation, labeling, and protection of geographical indications of spirit drinks and repealing Council Regulation (EEC) No 1576/89. Under this regulation, brinjevec became a protected drink with geographical origin.

The experts of the European Commission were primarily interested in the natural process of brinjevec production which is produced without any additives. Because of the original production and the characteristics of the kraški brinjevec, the drink is a candidate for the classification as a specialty on the list of world-famous drinks.

Kraški brinjevec is made of juniper berries from the species Juniperus communis. Juniperus communis is a barbed evergreen shrub or low tree that grows in a dry karst terrain. It is a monosex plant and only female plants grow berries. Juniper berries ripen only every two or even three years, so the same bush often carries both mature and immature berries. Mature berries are fleshy, dark blue, have a refreshing fruity smell and a slightly sweet and bitter taste.

Berries are gathered in October and November with the help of a wooden stick and a specially shaped riddle. The work is difficult and time consuming. After that, the berries are cleaned, ground with a special grinder, dipped in water (3 to 4 times the quantity of berries) in a hermetically sealed container for 4 weeks at a temperature between 15 to 20 degrees Celsius.

After the alcoholic fermentation of the mash ends, distillation happens in two steps in special copper stills. Copper is commonly used in the construction of high-quality stills due to its ability to absorb sulfur compounds in the distilled vapor. During the first distillation, an essential oil (brinjevo olje 'juniper oil') is separated from the spirit. Half a liter of the oil is obtained from 100 kg of juniper berries. The second distillation is long and slow. The brandy gets its harmonious flavor only after six months of ripening.

The shape and volume of bottles (200, 500, and 700 ml) is also prescribed.

Medicinal use

Brinjevec is used as a traditional folk medicine for many problems. It stimulates blood flow in the abdominal cavity and helps cure stomach ache, indigestion, gastritis and intestinal problems. It is also used as a digestive. In the past, women used it to soothe menstrual pain. They often anointed the lower abdomen with ethereal juniper oil (a side product after first distillation) followed by a sip of brinjevec. Some older people still call brinjevec a women's drink because in the past the domestic pharmacy was under women's domain. Inhaling the steam from boiling water mixed with few drops of brinjevec relieves the respiratory passages and alleviates respiratory problems of asthmatics.

Essential oil is a side product of distilling brinjevec. As mentioned, it was used to ease menstrual pain, stomach ache or cure digestion problems of children by anointing it around navel and lower abdomen. This oil was sold in the past to local pharmacies mostly in Trieste (Italy) and it is still very expensive (€160 or more per liter in 2010).

Juniper oil is also used to add flavors to some gins.

This oil is called brinjevo olje in Slovene

Major brands

Most of the commercially produced brinjevec is made from imported juniper berries from Bosnia-Herzegovina, Montenegro, and other Balkan countries. Some brinjevec is only a flavored aged natural distillate even if sold as brinjevec. These brandies do not bear the geographical indication kraški brinjevec.

There are several registered distilleries around Slovenia distilling and selling brinjevec but it can be bought in small quantities from local farmers as well who distill it for personal use.

Kraški Brinjevec

  Brin - Brinjevec
 Kraševka
 Budič, Budič Brinjevec

Brinjevec

 Dana
 Klanšek
 Kmetija Matic
 Kartuzija Pleterje
 Mikelj Spirits

References

Slovenian distilled drinks
Gins
Slovenian cuisine

cs:Pálenka
eo:Brando
fo:Brennivín
fr:Spiritueux
it:Aquavite
ml:മദ്യം
nl:Sterkedrank
ja:蒸留酒
no:Brennevin
nn:Brennevin
ksh:Schabau (Üvversich)
qu:Hayaq yaku
sk:Destilát (nápoj)
fi:Viina
sv:Spritdryck
th:สุรา
zh:烈酒